Vourvoura is a village in the municipal unit of Skiritida, Arcadia, Greece. It is situated in the northwestern part of the Parnon mountains, at 1,000 m above sea level. In 2011, it had a population of 252. It is 5 km west of Agios Petros, 5 km north of Karyes (Laconia) and 22 km southeast of Tripoli.

History

Ottoman Vourvoura
Vourvoura was settled sometime between 1750 and 1760. Vourvoura was liberated in early February 1770 by Greek rebels during the Orlov revolt. The Ottomans managed to reclaim Vourvoura and suppress the Orlov revolt on 17 June 1771.

Liberation of Vourvoura
The Greek war of independence began on 25 March 1821, and by the 28th of March Vourvoura was liberated.

Greek Vourvoura
In 1822 three families escaped from Chios and fled to Vourvoura due to the Chios massacre. In 1863 the Αθλητικός Σύλλογος Βουρβούρων was founded in Vourvoura. In 1917 the first car was brought to Vourvoura. In 1940 106 male Greeks from Vouvoura volunteered to fight for the fatherland in the Greco Italian war. In 1941 life was tough as Nazi Germany had defeated Greece in the Battle of Greece and Germany sent Italian soldiers to Vourvorua to keep watch and occupy the village. Food and water were nowhere to be to found as the Germans and Italians confiscated and stole food out of houses and created a famine for Greece. When the Italians surrendered in 1943 the Germans came and killed anyone they saw on the streets including 80-year-old men and 6-year-old children. The Germans also burnt and destroyed houses and crops. The worst to happen was on 26th and 27th of June 1944 where the Germans killed 39 people. The day afterward, the Germans retreated from Vourvoura because the Allies had reached Sparta. From the years 1946-1949 Vourvoura was embroiled in a civil war between royalists and communists, in which members of the communist andartes were hiding in Vourvoura and fighting in the nearby mountains. In 2011 Vouvoura was merged into the Skiritida municipality.

Population

Notable people
Sam Panopoulos (1934-2017), inventor of the Hawaiian pizza, in Chatam, ON.
Charalambos Zouras, an Olympian during the 1896 Summer Olympics.

References

External links
Vourvoura at the GTP Travel Pages
Vourvoura at the University of Patras's Arcadia and Historic Arcadia section

Populated places in Arcadia, Peloponnese